The final repository for short-lived radioactive waste (SFR) in Forsmark, Sweden, is a facility for the storage of low and intermediate level radioactive waste produced by all of Sweden's nuclear power plants, and has been active since April 1988.

SFR has four separate rock vaults and one silo; reaching a capacity to store 60,000m³ of radioactive waste. SFR currently receives approximately 600 m³ of waste per year.

References

Nuclear power in Sweden
Radioactive waste repositories
Waste management in Sweden